WOMI (1490 AM) is a radio station broadcasting a News Talk Information format.  Licensed to Owensboro, Kentucky, United States, the station serves the Owensboro area.  The station is currently owned by Townsquare Media and features programming from Fox News Radio, NBC News Radio, Compass Media Networks, Genesis Communications Network, Premiere Networks, USA Radio Network, and Westwood One.

History
WOMI made its debut at 7:00pm on the evening of Monday, February 7, 1938, becoming the seventh radio station in the state of Kentucky, with a live celebratory broadcast from the Hotel Owensboro. The station began with 250 watts of daytime power and 100 watts at night at 1500 kilohertz. Owensboro Messenger-Inquirer publisher Lawrence Hager formed Owensboro Broadcasting Company as owner and operator of the station. A modern two story art deco building had been constructed on Frederica Street, just south of Byers Avenue, to house the new broadcast operation. Lyell Ludwig was hired as WOMI's first general manager but Hager replaced Ludwig in 1939, with the newspaper's city editor Hugh Potter. Potter's wife, Cliffordean, became the station's program director and the couple moved into the station's second floor apartment where they remained until their retirement in 1972.

On March 29, 1941, WOMI moved to 1490 kilohertz as part of the North American Broadcast Treaty which reallocated frequencies for some 1,300 AM stations. WOMI had no network affiliation until it joined the Mutual Broadcasting System in 1944, just in time for the network's coverage of the D-Day Normandy invasion of World War II. WOMI stayed with Mutual until 1959, when the station became a CBS Radio affiliate.

WOMI had primarily been a full service station during the Potter years of 1939 to 1972. The station experimented with various formats following the departure of the Potters. The station's post-Potter banner years were the mid to late 1970's when a well-executed Top 40 format drew big audience numbers for the station. WOMI joined NBC Radio in 1979, and then, it joined that network's "TalkNet" in 1985, and soon found its niche as the city's News-Talk outlet. 

In 1993, the station was sold to Evansville, Indiana-based Brill Broadcasting. In 2002, the station was sold to current owner Townsquare Media.

References

External links

Radio Locator Information for W256CF

OMI
Townsquare Media radio stations
Owensboro, Kentucky
1938 establishments in Kentucky
Radio stations established in 1938